Elia is a name which may be a variant of the names Elias, Elijah, Eli or Eliahu, and may refer to:

People
 Aelia (gens) or Elia, a gens of Ancient Rome

Mononymic
 Elia or Elijah, a biblical prophet
 Elia, a pen-name of Charles Lamb

First name
Elia Abu Madi, (1890–1957), Lebanese poet
Elia Barceló (born 1957), Spanish writer
Elia Goode Byington (1858–1936), American journalist
Elia Cmíral (born 1950), Czech film composer
Elia Dalla Costa (1872–1961), Italian cardinal and Archbishop of Florence
Elia del Medigo (1458–1493), Greek rabbi 
Elia Favilli (born 1989), Italian cyclist
Elia Frosio (1913–2005), Italian cyclist 
Elia Galera (born 1973), Spanish actress 
Elia Kaiyamo (born 1951), Namibian politician
Elia Kazan (1909–2003), American director and producer
Elia Legati (born 1986), Italian football player
Elia Levita (1469–1549), German Hebrew scholar
Elia Liut (1894–1952), Italian aviator
Elia Luini (born 1979), Italian rower
Elia Millosevich (1848–1919), Italian astronomer
Elia W. Peattie (1862–1935), American journalist
Elia Peraizza (died 1685), Venetian military leader
Elia Ravelomanantsoa (born 1960), Malagasy politician
Elia Rigotto (born 1982), Italian cyclist
Elia Soriano (born 1989), German football player
Elia Suleiman (born 1960), Palestinian director
Elia Viviani (born 1989), Italian cyclist
Elia Zenghelis (born 1937), Greek architect

Surname
Alessandro Elia (born 1990), Italian footballer
Antonella Elia (born 1963), Italian actress
Bruce Elia (born 1953), American football player
Eljero Elia (born 1987), Dutch footballer
Jon Elia (1931–2002), Pakistani poet
Lee Elia (born 1937), American baseball player and coach
Leopoldo Elia (1925–2008), Italian politician
Meschak Elia (born 1997), Congolese footballer
Sapphire Elia (born 1987), British actres
Maria Elia (born 1968), British chef

Places
Elia, a historical and alternative name for the Jane and Finch neighbourhood of Toronto, Canada
Elia, Kyrenia, Cyprus
Elia, Nicosia, Cyprus
Elia, Mykonos, Greece

Other uses
European League of Institutes of the Arts (ELIA), an organization of art schools
Elia (sculpture), a prominent public artwork in Denmark
Elia System Operator, an electric power transmission system operator of Belgium
Olive Tree (Greece), a political movement
European Language Industry Association (ELIA); see language industry
 Elia (gastropod), a genus of gastropods in the family Clausiliidae

See also
 Eli, name
 Elie (disambiguation)
 Elijah (prophet)
 Elias, the Greek equivalent of Elijah
 Elis or Ilia, a historic region of the Peloponnese peninsula of Greece
 Essays of Elia, a collection of essays written by Charles Lamb
 Ilia (disambiguation)
 Ilya (disambiguation)